Milton Historic District is a national historic district located at Milton, Caswell County, North Carolina.  It encompasses 15 contributing buildings in the town of Milton. The district includes notable examples of Federal and Greek Revival style architecture.  In addition to the separately listed Milton State Bank and Union Tavern, other notable buildings include the Clay-Lewis-Irvine House, Winstead House, Presbyterian Church, Baptist Meeting House (Milton Church), Old Shops, Old Stores, and row houses. Fittings in the Presbyterian Church and Baptist Meeting House (Milton Church) are attributed to noted African-American cabinetmaker Thomas Day.

It was added to the National Register of Historic Places in 1973.

References

External links
 
 
 
 

Historic American Buildings Survey in North Carolina
Historic districts on the National Register of Historic Places in North Carolina
Federal architecture in North Carolina
Greek Revival architecture in North Carolina
Buildings and structures in Caswell County, North Carolina
National Register of Historic Places in Caswell County, North Carolina